Drummond Peak is a low, isolated rock peak 19 nautical miles (35 km) southwest of La Gorce Peak, rising above the ice surface of Edward VII Peninsula. It was mapped by the United States Geological Survey from surveys and U.S. Navy air photos, 1955–59, and was named by the Advisory Committee on Antarctic Names for Lieutenant Glen N. Drummond, Jr., U.S. Navy, Assistant Aerologist on the staff of the U.S. Naval Support Force, Antarctica, 1959–62.

References 

Mountains of King Edward VII Land